There are five planning regions of Latvia after 2021 reform; Kurzeme Planning Region, Latgale Planning Region, Riga Planning Region, Vidzeme Planning Region and Zemgale Planning Region. The boundaries of the regions aligns to the boundaries of the municipalities of Latvia following the municipality reform of 1 July 2009. The planning regions of Latvia are not administrative territorial divisions, since they are not mentioned in the law that prescribes the administrative territorial divisions of Latvia.The territories of the planning region are determined by the Cabinet of Ministers' regulations of June 22, 2021 No. 418 " Rules on the territories of the planning region ".

After 2021 reform some Riga Region's lands were incorporated into Kurzeme and Vidzeme. Until then, the planning regions were identical in area to the statistical regions, except with different names and the city of Riga being separate from the rest of Riga Planning Region.

List

History 
Regional institutions have been formed since 1997, following the initiatives of local governments for joint development planning. According to the  Regional Development Law , five planning regions have been established in Latvia - Kurzeme planning region, Latgale planning region, Riga planning region, Vidzeme planning region and Zemgale planning region. The territories of the planning region are determined by the Cabinet of Ministers' regulations of June 22, 2021 No. 418 " Rules on the territories of the planning region ".

See also 
Historical Latvian Lands

References 

Subdivisions of Latvia
Latvia geography-related lists
Reform in Latvia